Zeng Huifen (born 4 February 1962), also known as Jacqueline Chan, is a Singaporean actress. She was prominently a full-time Mediacorp artiste from 1983 to 1996. She is best known for starring in numerous Singaporean dramas from the 1980s to the 1990s, most notably in Samsui Women.

Career
Zeng started her acting career in 1983 after completing SBC's 3rd artiste drama training course and debuted in Army Series (新兵小传). She later starred alongside her drama coursemate Wang Yuqing in the Singapore Broadcasting Corporation's classic drama The Flying Fish.

Zeng continued to perform in several dramas such as the 1985 hit drama Takeover (人在旅途) which gained her popularity in China. It was her role as the lead character Ah Gui in the 1986 blockbuster period drama Samsui Women which shot her to fame.

Zeng continued taking on more lead roles in various local television and telemovie productions. In 1995, she was nominated in the Star Awards Best Actress category for her role in the telemovie The Chance Of Life. In 1996, she became the first actress to ever be nominated for three different awards at the annual Star Awards. The three awards she was nominated for were: the Best Actress Award for Dr Justice II, Best Supporting Actress Award for The Teochew Family, and the Top 5 Most Popular Female Artiste Award. Zeng managed to bag the Best Supporting Actress award.

Zeng retired from showbiz in 1997.

Personal life
Zeng married Jimmy Lim, an oil rig engineer, in May 1991 and have 2 children. In 1997, Zeng relocated to Texas, United States with her family for her husband's work. She returned to Singapore with her family in 1998.

Since retiring Zeng has made several public appearances, such as Zoe Tay's wedding in 2001 and during Zeng's good friend Chen Liping's Slim 10 court case, showing up with Tan, in October 2003. She has also made several guest appearances at MediaCorp's anniversary events. Most recently, she was contacted by MediaCorp for the anniversary special feature Star Reunion (那些年，我们一起看电视) in 2012 and she replied via e-mail that she was doing well.

Selected filmography

References

1962 births
Living people
Singaporean people of Chinese descent
Singaporean film actresses
Singaporean television actresses
20th-century Singaporean actresses